Arts-based training is a form of employee training.

In the workplace 

In recent years, there has been growth in the use of arts programs by corporations to meet a wide range of employee training and organizational development needs. In the United States alone, more than 400 of the Fortune 500 corporations and countless smaller firms employ arts-based learning in participatory workshops, skill-based training programs, hands-on consultancies with business units, individual and team coaching, case studies in-action, and lecture/demonstrations at leadership conferences.  Companies use these various programs to foster creative thinking, promote the development of new leadership models, and strengthen employee skills in critical areas such as collaboration, conflict resolution, change management, presentation/public performance, and intercultural communication. This represents a dramatic shift in the boundaries that traditionally defined experiences relevant to the business world – a shift triggered by profound technological and social changes that have transformed the culture of business over the past decade.

Arts-based training can be defined as employee or staff development training (such as team building, communication/listening skills) which is delivered using the arts (music, visual art, drama etc.).  It is used in many sectors in business from solicitors and law firms, to local councils and community-based organisations.  In the United Kingdom it began to be used in the 1990s, primarily in London, and has now spread through the country. In the United States, arts organizations like Orpheus Chamber Orchestra and Second City Theatre, along with individual practitioners such as visual artist Todd Siler and jazz musician Michael Gold pioneered this field at about the same time.  "Orchestrating Collaboration at Work" by Arthur Van Gundy and Linda Naiman, published in 2003 was one of the first books published for practitioners in the field. In recent years, organisations all over the world have begun to adopt arts based learning.

Worldwide 

Lotte Darsø, author of Artful Creation: Learning-Tales of Arts-in-Business was the first to map the interplay between arts and business in Europe and North America.  The key questions asked in her research were: "In what ways can business learn from artists," "What can be learned?," and "What kind of learning takes place?" Darsø proposes two approaches for Arts-in-Business: the Arts applied as an instrument for team building, communication training, leadership development, problem-solving and innovation; and the Arts integrated as a strategic process of organisational transformation. Steven Taylor and Donna Ladkin offered a model of four different processes, skills transfer, projective techniques, illustration of essence, and making, used in arts-based learning in 2009. Schuima's 2012 book, "The Value of Arts for Business" provides a comprehensive review of the use of arts in business.

Organizations 

Terry McGraw, chairman and CEO of The McGraw Hill Companies, characterizes creativity as a "business imperative", and puts his companies’ successful experiences with arts-based learning in a broad strategic context of "surfacing creativity" through engagement with the arts.

Keith Weed, Chairman, Lever Fabergé sees employee involvement as a key part of developing and sustaining an innovative and creative business. Catalyst, their internal arts and creativity program "brings artists and arts organisations into the business to motivate, inspire, challenge and unlock the potential of our staff, on both a professional and personal level. Artists and arts organisations come into the workplace to tackle specific business issues, from creative thinking to leadership styles and writing skills."

In reviewing The Art of Business: Make All Your Work a Work of Art (Davis, 2005) Tom Peters commented:
The authors persuasively argue that we are entering an economy which will value—insist upon!—a new way of looking at value creation. They call it moving from an emphasis on "economic flow" (input-output) to "artistic flow." The altered nature of enterprise, the "four elements" of new business thinking: "See yourself as an artist." "See your work as a work of art." "See your customers as an audience." "See your competition as teachers."

References

External links
 "The art of inspiration" – article about arts-based training

Training